Ahmed Samir Abdel Moneim Aboual Amaim (born 3 October 1981) is an Egyptian retired footballer. He is currently working as a youth coach for Zamalek SC.

Career
In January 2008, Samir joined Lierse from Egyptian team Haras El-Hodood. Samir was given the shirt number 10. He quickly established himself in Lierse's first team and effectively contributed to Lierse promotion to the Belgian First Division in 2009-10 season.

References

External links
Ahmed Samir at Footballdatabase

1981 births
Living people
Egyptian footballers
Egyptian expatriate footballers
Baladeyet El Mahalla SC players
Zamalek SC players
Haras El Hodoud SC players
Lierse S.K. players
Al Masry SC players
Egyptian Premier League players
Challenger Pro League players
Association football fullbacks
Egyptian expatriate sportspeople in Belgium
Expatriate footballers in Belgium